Ken LaCorte (born February 5, 1965) is a former executive at the Fox News Channel. He owns several websites including Conservative Edition News, Liberal Edition News, and LaCorte News.

Early life and education 
LaCorte was born in Alhambra, California on February 5, 1965. He attended Claremont McKenna College and earned a bachelor's degree in government in 1987. He received a master’s degree in professional studies, in 1988 from the State University of New York.

Career 
LaCorte began his career as a communications specialist. In the late 1980s and early 1990s, he worked as a media consultant for companies and candidates in the United States and internationally, including presidential campaigns in Colombia, Guatemala and Venezuela. In 1997, he was the marketing manager for Healthline Medical. In 1998, he ran as a Republican primary candidate in California's 44th State Assembly District. The Los Angeles Times reported that he was a member of the National Rifle Association, generally opposed to stricter gun legislation.

In 1997, he challenged California law by publishing the state's Megan's Law list.  Despite a warning from the state's Attorney General, LaCorte hand copied the state's high risk sex offenders and published them online.  In 2004, California officially published the Megan's Law database on the internet.

LaCorte worked in senior management for Fox News for nearly two decades.  He became the Bureau Chief for western region at the Fox News Channel in 1998 and the Director of News Editorial in 2003. LaCorte was made the VP of Fox News Digital in 2006 where he oversaw editorial content of the website.  The network sent him to Gaza in 2006 to press for the release of kidnapped journalists Steve Centanni and Olaf Wiig.

Alleged Fox News Trump Cover-up 
In March 2019, Jane Mayer reported in The New Yorker that Fox News reporter Diana Falzone had the story of the Stormy Daniels–Donald Trump scandal before the 2016 election, but that LaCorte told her, “Good reporting, kiddo. But Rupert [Murdoch] wants Donald Trump to win. So just let it go,” and the story was killed. LaCorte denied making the statement to Falzone and said he killed the story because the evidence was not there, saying, "I was the person who made the call. I didn’t run it upstairs to Roger Ailes or others...I didn’t do it to protect Donald Trump," adding "[Falzone] had put up a story that just wasn’t anywhere close to being something I was comfortable publishing” and pointed out numerous ways in which Falzone's article failed to meet journalistic standards of verification. Nik Richie, who claimed to be one of the sources for the Falzone story, called LaCorte's account "complete bullshit," adding “Fox News was culpable. I voted for Trump, and I like Fox, but they did their own ‘catch and kill’ on the story to protect him.”

Launch of news websites 
After LaCorte left Fox News at the end of 2016, he partnered with John Moody, another former Fox News executive and longtime ally of Roger Ailes, to form LaCorte News in 2018. LaCorte also recruited former NPR editorial director Michael Oreskes to join him and Moody to launch LaCorte News in 2019 as a digital news startup with the stated goal of "restoring faith in media."

In November 2019, a New York Times report alleged that LaCorte used "Russian tactics" to push inflammatory content on websites Conservative Edition News and Liberal Edition News which he controlled. LaCorte's ownership of the sites was not known until the Times investigation, which was jointly conducted with the Virginia security firm Nisos. The investigation found no ties between LaCorte and Russia, and stated: "Security experts said the adoption of Russian tactics by profit-motivated Americans had made it much harder to track disinformation." LaCorte defended himself to the Times, saying that he ran the politically-charged sites as a way to drive traffic to his centrist site LaCorte News. LaCorte said “I wanted to try to find middle ground.” LaCorte admitted that he had been secretly operating the partisan websites and had hired Macedonian teenagers to write the content.

In late November 2019, the Facebook pages for LaCorte's Conservative Edition News and Liberal Edition News were shut down for terms of service violations that included manipulation of site privileges and engagement with well-known Macedonian “troll farms”.

References

1965 births
Living people
American television executives
People from Alhambra, California
Claremont McKenna College alumni